The BFD Energy Challenger is a professional tennis tournament played on clay courts. It is currently part of the Association of Tennis Professionals (ATP) Challenger Tour. It is held annually in Rome, Italy since 2015.

Past finals

Singles

Doubles

References

ATP Challenger Tour
Clay court tennis tournaments
Recurring sporting events established in 2015
2015 establishments in Italy
Tennis tournaments in Italy